Planchonella luteocostata is a species of plant in the family Sapotaceae. It is endemic to New Caledonia. As with other plants in the same genus, it possesses stamens that are located below (and rarely in) the tube orifice; a multi-seeded fruit, as well as foliaceous cotyledons embedded in endosperm.

References

Further reading
Munzinger, Jérôme, and Ulf Swenson. "Three new species of Planchonella Pierre (Sapotaceae) with a dichotomous and an online key to the genus in New Caledonia." Adansonia 31.1 (2009): 175–189.
Héquet, Vanessa, Sandrine Isnard, and T. Ibanez. "Etude floristique et structurale de la forêt sèche mise en défens sur la propriété Metzdorf à Poya T+ 10." (2013).

External links

Endemic flora of New Caledonia
luteocostata